HMS Newcastle was a 50-gun fourth rate of the Royal Navy which saw service in the Napoleonic Wars and the War of 1812.

A new type of warship, a large spar-decked frigate, Newcastle and her near sister  were a response to the threat the heavy American spar-decked frigates posed during the War of 1812. Newcastle proved a successful ship and operated in squadrons that chased the American frigates, but ultimately failed to catch them before the war ended. She spent some time as the flagship on the North American Station before returning to Britain in 1822 and being laid up. She was later converted to a lazarette. She spent the rest of her career in this role, until she was sold in 1850 for breaking up.

Construction
HMS Newcastle was ordered from the Blackwall-based firm of Wigram, Wells & Green on 6 May 1813. She was laid down in June 1813 and built of pitch pine to a design by émigré designer Jean-Louis Barrallier. Built of softwood to get her into service as quickly as possible, Leander was launched on 10 November 1813, less than five months after laying down. She was moved to Woolwich Dockyard and completed there by 23 March 1814. Ordered alongside Newcastle was the similar 50-gun .

Newcastle was a spar-deck frigate, designed to carry thirty 24-pounders on her main deck, and twenty-four 42-pounder carronades on her spar deck (two fewer carronades than her half-sister), with four 24-pounders on her forecastle. In 1815, after the War of 1812 and Napoleonic Wars, Newcastle and Leander were fitted with accommodation for a flag officer with a poop deck built over the quarterdeck, and were mostly used as flagships on foreign stations, replacing older 50-gun ships that had previously filled this role. Both ships were re-rated as 60-gun fourth rates in February 1817.

Career

Newcastle was commissioned under her first commander, Captain George Collier, in November 1813, but Collier was moved to command of the Leander a month later, and was replaced as commander by Captain Lord George Stuart.

On 23 May 1814 Newcastle ran down Diligence, Grant, master, which was sailing from Southampton to Guernsey with 40 passengers. The passengers were all saved but the mate on Diligence drowned. Diligence was towed back to Southampton and Newcastle had to put back to Portsmouth for repairs.

Newcastle, and  shared the proceeds of the capture on 28 December 1814 of the notorious American privateer Prince de Neufchatel. At the time of her capture, Prince de Neufchatel was armed with 18 guns and had a crew of 129 men. She was eight days out of Boston.<ref> HMS Leander – Captain's Log</ref>

On 4 January 1815, Acasta, Leander and Newcastle recaptured John.

Chasing the USS ConstitutionLeander, under Sir George Collier, had been watching , then in harbour at Boston. When Collier had to interrupt his surveillance in order to take Leander to Halifax to resupply, he left Acasta and Newcastle off the port. Whilst Collier was away, Constitution and two other heavy frigates left Boston. On his return, Collier prepared to pursue, but had orders to send Acasta into Halifax for a refit. Captain Kerr of Acasta pleaded to be allowed to join the chase; Collier relented and allowed Acasta to remain. The British squadron eventually sighted Constitution in heavy weather off Porto Praya on 11 March 1815. Due to the weather and some confusion, Constitution eluded the British.

Fire from Newcastle led Levants crew to run her ashore, where Acasta then captured her. Collier eventually left Acasta and Newcastle windward of Barbados while he searched for Constitution. However, she had returned to port, thus avoiding an engagement.

FateNewcastle'' was paid off at Portsmouth in January 1822. Between April and June 1824 she underwent fitting there as a lazaretto. She then moved to Liverpool in September 1827. The Navy sold her on 12 June 1850 to John Brown for £2,500.

External links

Notes, citations, and references

Notes

Citations

References
 
 
 
 
 

Frigates of the Royal Navy
Ships built by the Blackwall Yard
1813 ships
War of 1812 ships of the United Kingdom